The Seoul National Cemetery is located in Dongjak-dong, Dongjak-gu, Seoul, South Korea. The cemetery is reserved for Korean veterans, including those who died in the Korean independence movement, Korean War, and Vietnam War. Four South Korean presidents are buried in the cemetery.

The Seoul National Cemetery is near Dongjak Station on Seoul Subway Line 4 or Seoul Subway Line 9. Except for some special days, the Seoul National Cemetery usually allows access to the public.

History 
When established by presidential decree of Syngman Rhee in 1956, Seoul National Cemetery was the country's only national cemetery. As the cemetery reached capacity in the early 1970s, Daejeon National Cemetery was established in 1976. Both cemeteries were originally overseen by the Ministry of Defence until 2006, when the Daejeon National Cemetery was transferred to the Ministry of Patriots' and Veterans' Affairs (South Korea).

Notable people buried

 Syngman Rhee – first President of South Korea – buried 1965
 Park Chung-hee – third President of South Korea – buried 1979
 Yuk Young-soo – wife of President Park – buried 1974
 Kim Dae-jung – 8th President of South Korea – buried 2009
 Kim Young-sam – 7th President of South Korea – buried 2015
 Lee Beom-seok – Prime Minister of South Korea – buried 1972
 Park Tae-joon – Founder of POSCO – buried 2011
 Chae Myung-shin – ROK Army General – buried 2013
 Jang In-hwan – Korean Independence activist and assassin of Durham Stevens – reburied 1975
 Yi Cheol-seung – Member of the National Assembly of the Republic of Korea
Frank Schofield – Canadian veterinarian and Korean Independence activist – buried 1970 (first foreigner to be buried in the cemetery)
Soh Jaipil – Korean Independence activist and first Korean naturalized citizen of the United States –buried 1994
Lee Hee-ho - widow of President Kim Dae-jung - buried 2019

Incidents and controversy 
On June 22, 1970, three North Korean agents broke into the cemetery and planted a bomb. One agent was killed when the bomb was accidentally detonated.

In August 2005, controversy was stirred by the visit of a North Korean delegation to the cemetery. The delegation was led by Kim Ki-Nam, and numbered 182 officials. The visit not only sparked outrage among those opposed to warmer relations with the North, but also raised fears that a future delegation from the South might be expected to pay their respects to Kim Il-sung in Pyongyang.

On his death on August 18, 2009, former President of South Korea Kim Dae-jung was buried in at the National Cemetery, instead of in Daejeon National Cemetery, the initially planned burial site.

See also

 History of South Korea
 Daejeon National Cemetery
 Kumsusan Palace of the Sun – in North Korea
 List of national cemeteries by country
 Revolutionary Martyrs' Cemetery – in North Korea
 Patriotic Martyrs' Cemetery – in North Korea
 United Nations Memorial Cemetery in Busan
 Cemetery for North Korean and Chinese Soldiers in Paju
 War Memorial of Korea – in Seoul
 May 18th National Cemetery

References

External links

 Korean-language site of the National Memorial Board
 

Buildings and structures in Seoul
Korean War memorials and cemeteries
Cemeteries in South Korea
National cemeteries
1956 establishments in South Korea
Ministry of National Defense (South Korea)